Trogoparvus is a genus of beetles in the family Dermestidae, containing the following species:

 Trogoparvus sulcatopygus Pic, 1927
 Trogoparvus sumatrensis Háva, 2001

References

Dermestidae